Ibn Khalaf al-Murādī, (11th century) was an Andalusian engineer. 

Al-Murādī was the author of the technological manuscript entitled Kitāb al-asrār fī natā'ij al-afkār (The Book of Secrets in the Results of Thoughts or The Book of Secrets in the Results of Ideas). It was copied and used at the court of Alfonso VI of León and Castile in Christian Spain in the 11th century. 

The manuscript provides information about a "Castle and Gazelle Clock" and many other forms of complicated clocks and ingenious devices.

In 2008, the Book of Secrets of al-Muradi was published in facsimile, translated in English/Italian/French/Arabic and in an electronic edition with all machines interpreted in 3D, by the Italian study center Leonardo3.

References

Inventors of the medieval Islamic world
11th-century scientists
11th-century people from al-Andalus